Rajesh Ghodge (15 January 1975 – 13 January 2019) was an Indian cricketer who played in two first-class and eight List A matches for Goa between 1997 and 2005. In January 2019, he collapsed while playing in a local cricket tournament, and died later in hospital.

References

External links
 

1975 births
2019 deaths
Indian cricketers
Goa cricketers
Place of birth missing
Cricket deaths
Sport deaths in India